Arlington Township may refer to:

Arlington Township, Michigan
Arlington Township, Sibley County, Minnesota

Township name disambiguation pages